Vice Girls is a 1997 American film directed by Richard Gabai and starring Lana Clarkson.

It was made by Sunset Films, the film production company of Jim Wynorski and Cinetel, and was released through Concorde Pictures.

Premise
Three policewomen go undercover to try and trap a serial killer.

Cast
Lana Clarkson as Jan Cooper
Liat Goodson as Edith Block
Kimberley Roberts as Mindy Turner 
Bart Muller as John Russo

Reception
B movie expert Joe Bob Briggs has described Vice Girls as "the goofy story of three babe cops on the trail of a serial killer", where policewomen "pose as strippers, wearing a special black-leather bra with Nipple Lenses attached to a secret camera, as they smoke out the killer."  According to Phil Spector's biographer Mick Brown, Clarkson's performance in Vice Girls was one of several "schlock movies" that led to her becoming recognized as a B movie star "with a large and devoted fan base".

References

External links

Vice Girls at Letterbox DVD
Vice Girls at Lana Clarkson

1997 films
American serial killer films
American slasher films
Girls with guns films
1997 drama films
1990s English-language films
Films directed by Richard Gabai
1990s American films